Farhan Ganie (born 1 March 1995), is an Indian footballer who plays as a defensive midfielder for Real Kashmir in the I-League.

Career
After playing in the second division with Real Kashmir for two seasons, he made his professional debut at the age of 26 for the club in a match against Minerva Punjab FC on 31 October 2018 in I League. Ganie scored his first goal for the club in a match against Churchil Brothers on 31 January 2019.

Honours
Real Kashmir
IFA Shield: 2020, 2021

Reference

1995 births
Living people
Indian footballers
Association football midfielders
I-League players
Real Kashmir FC players
Footballers from Jammu and Kashmir